Zulema Fátima Yoma (born 18 December 1942) was the First Lady of Argentina from 1989 until 1991, when she divorced President Carlos Menem.

Biography
A native of Nonogasta in La Rioja Province, Yoma was married for twenty-five years (1966–91) to Carlos Saúl Menem, who served as President of Argentina from July 1989 to December 1999. Her parents were Syrian Muslims, as Menem's were. They had two children, a son, Carlos Saúl Facundo Menem Yoma, who died in a helicopter crash in 1995, and a daughter, Zulema María Eva Menem, who, starting in 1991, fulfilled the role of First Lady at formal occasions for the remaining eight years of her father's presidency.

Controversies
Her son, Carlos Saúl Facundo Menem, died in a helicopter crash in 1995. Although it was ruled an accident, there are conspiracy theories that say he was actually murdered, of which Zulema Yoma and her daughter Zulemita are convinced. Yoma felt her son's death was politically motivated and even stated that the corpse buried in the tomb of the Islamic cemetery is not that of his son, requesting an exhumation.

Her son had an illegitimate daughter named Antonella Pinetta, who was born in 1988. Yoma did not recognize her as her granddaughter and refused to have her DNA examined, requesting that the test should be made from the body of her son, to support her request for the exhumation of the body. While President Menem agreed to participate in the DNA testing, he refused to proceed with the exhumation.

References

1942 births
Living people
Argentine Muslims
First ladies and gentlemen of Argentina
Argentine people of Syrian descent
Argentine people of Arab descent
People from La Rioja Province, Argentina
Menem family